Damien Birkinhead (born 8 April 1993) is an Australian shot putter who competed in the 2016 Summer Olympics in Rio de Janeiro. He placed tenth in the final. His personal bests are 21.35 metres outdoors (Hobart 2016) and 19.11 metres indoors (Birmingham 2018).

International competitions

References

External links 
 Damien Birkinhead at Athletics Australia
 Damien Birkinhead at Australian Athletics Historical Results
 
 
 
 

1993 births
Living people
Australian male shot putters
Olympic athletes of Australia
Athletes (track and field) at the 2010 Summer Youth Olympics
Athletes (track and field) at the 2014 Commonwealth Games
Athletes (track and field) at the 2016 Summer Olympics
Athletes (track and field) at the 2018 Commonwealth Games
Sportspeople from Geelong
Commonwealth Games competitors for Australia